Cyperus pulguerensis is a species of sedge that is native to Puerto Rico.

See also 
 List of Cyperus species

References 

pulguerensis
Plants described in 2005
Flora of Puerto Rico
Flora without expected TNC conservation status